Myxicola infundibulum is a species of polychaete worm from the family Sabellidae. The body consists of a head, a cylindrical, segmented body and a tail piece. The head consists of a Prostomium (part of the mouth) and a peristomium (area around the mouth) and carries paired appendages (palps, antennae and cirri).

References 
 Myxicola infundibulum - World Register of Marine Species (2 November 2016).

External links 

 Myxicola infundibulum - Biodiversity Heritage Library - Bibliografia
 Myxicola infundibulum - NCBI Taxonomy Database
 Myxicola infundibulum - Global Biodiversity Information Facility
 Myxicola infundibulum - Encyclopedia of Life

Sabellida